Maurice Delafosse (20 December 1870 – 13 November 1926) was a French ethnographer and colonial official who also worked in the field of the languages of Africa. In a review of his daughter's biography of him he was described as "one of the most outstanding French colonial administrators and ethnologists of his time."

Career

Delafosse was born on 20 December 1870 in the village of Sancergues in central France. He was the son of René Françoise Célestin Delafosse and Elise Marie Bidault and had five siblings.

Delafosse is known for his contributions to West African history and African languages. He began his study of Arabic in 1890 at the École des langues orientales with the renowned orientalist, Octave Houdas. He traveled to Algeria in 1891 with the Frères armés du Sahara, a Catholic organization concerned with combating the Trans-Saharan slave trade. Shortly afterwards, he spent one year in the French military as a zouave, second class, before returning to his formal studies at the École des langues orientales. After receiving his diploma, he was appointed as an assistant to Indigenous Affairs in the new French colony of Côte d'Ivoire. For a period the future ethnologist Charles Monteil was his assistant in the Côte d'Ivoire.

Delafosse had disagreements with the French government over the administration of French Africa, and, as a result, was "more or less banned from the colonies" for a large part of his life.

Selected publications

.
.
. Also available from the Internet Archive here.
. Also available from the Internet Archive here.
. Also available from the Internet Archive  here.
. 
. Also available from the Internet Archive here.
. Also available from the  Open Library.
. Gallica: Volume 1, Le Pays, les Peuples, les Langues; Volume 2, L'Histoire; Volume 3, Les Civilisations.
. Volume 1 is the Arabic text, Volume 2 is a translation into French. Reprinted by  Maisonneuve in 1964 and 1981. The French text is also available from Aluka but requires a subscription.

. Also available from the Internet Archive here.
.
 .
.

References

Sources

 A biography by his daughter.

Further reading

.

External links
 
 List of publications on WebAfrique

1870 births
Delafoss, Maurice
Linguists of Mande languages